Clubiona pacifica is a species of sac spider in the family Clubionidae. It is found in the United States and Canada.

References

External links

 

Clubionidae
Articles created by Qbugbot
Spiders described in 1896